The 1957 Kilkenny Senior Hurling Championship was the 63rd staging of the Kilkenny Senior Hurling Championship since its establishment by the Kilkenny County Board.

On 1 December 1957, John Locke's won the championship after a 4-04 to 0-05 defeat of Slieverue in the final. It remains their only championship triumph.

Results

Final

References

Kilkenny Senior Hurling Championship
Kilkenny Senior Hurling Championship